Uriah Alexander Hall (born July 31, 1984) is a Jamaican-American retired mixed martial artist, professional boxer, and a former kickboxer. He fought in the Middleweight division for the Ultimate Fighting Championship (UFC). He was the runner up on The Ultimate Fighter: Team Jones vs. Team Sonnen. Prior to his appearance on TUF, Hall competed in Bellator MMA and Ring of Combat, where he saw success in winning the ROC Championship. He is also the first UFC fighter in history to win a fight without throwing a single strike.

Early life
Uriah Hall was born in Spanish Town, Jamaica but moved to the New York City borough of Queens in the United States at the age of 13. Upon his arrival in the US, he was bullied at school but found refuge in martial arts at the age of 16. He is a second degree blackbelt in Tiger Schulmann's Mixed Martial Arts under Tiger Schulmann and also competed as a kickboxer in the World Combat League.

Mixed martial arts career

Early career
Hall started his career 3–0, including a TKO victory over Edwin Aguilar at Bellator 11, before fighting for the vacant Ring of Combat Middleweight title. Hall missed weight by 0.25 lbs and paid $100 penalty to his opponent. Despite missing weight, the fight remained a title fight. Hall won by first-round submission.

In September 2010, Hall suffered his first professional loss as he was defeated by future UFC champion Chris Weidman by TKO.

Hall suffered his second loss to Costas Philippou at Ring of Combat 34 by majority decision.

Hall would get back to his winning ways, collecting 3 consecutive victories over Aung La Nsang, Daniel Akinyemi and Nodar Kudukhashvili.  He won the vacant Ring of Combat Middleweight Championship against Kudukhashvili.

The Ultimate Fighter
On January 9, 2013, it was announced that Hall had been selected as a fighter for the seventeenth season of The Ultimate Fighter with coaches Jon Jones and Chael Sonnen.

In the opening round to get into the house, Hall took on Andy Enz and won via decision.  Hall was the number two fighter selection for Team Sonnen.

In episode 3 Hall faced Adam Cella from Team Jones.  With just ten seconds left in the first round, Hall unleashed a devastating spinning hook kick to Cella's head that knocked him unconscious.  The knockout was declared the most vicious knockout seen by Dana White over The Ultimate Fighter's eight-year history.

With the win, Hall advanced on to the quarter-finals and took on Bubba McDaniel of Team Jones. Hall knocked McDaniel out with a right straight counter-punch just as he was advancing forwards in the first round. That one punch broke McDaniel's face in three places. This led to Dana White stating that Hall was the "most dangerous" fighter in TUF history and coach Sonnen to say he will be a contender in the middleweight division.

Hall faced Dylan Andrews in the semi-finals.  He displayed a more technical approach, utilizing a jab through a majority of the first round.  Taken down in the second round by Andrews, Hall attempted a kimura submission before throwing strikes from the bottom position that severely hurt Andrews and forced him to lose his top control and caused Hall to land massive ground & pound to secure the TKO victory for Hall.

Ultimate Fighting Championship
With his successful 4–0 run on the show, Uriah gathered a lot of attention from the public. Hall then faced fellow Team Sonnen fighter Kelvin Gastelum in the finals at The Ultimate Fighter 17 Finale. Kelvin Gastelum, in an impressive upset, won the fight via split decision. Although Hall appeared in good spirits after the loss, the fight was not without controversy. While Gastelum had visible control of the fight in all three rounds, Hall fans have used FIGHTMETRIC scores to highlight the statistical dominance held by Hall in the second and third rounds. When asked about his performance in the post-fight conference, Hall stated that his emotional side, stemming from liking and training with Kelvin had gotten the best of him. He went on to say "Kelvin is a great guy, he's a tough kid you know, I think he's going to go really far in this sport and I'm happy for him."

Hall was expected to fight Nick Ring on August 17, 2013 at UFC Fight Night 26.  However, Ring was pulled from the bout and replaced by Hall's fellow The Ultimate Fighter 17 alumni Josh Samman. However, on July 17, it was announced that Samman was out of the bout and that Hall would face returning UFC fighter John Howard. He lost the fight via split decision.

Hall faced Chris Leben on December 28, 2013 at UFC 168. Leading up to the fight UFC President Dana White said that it was a must-win for Hall if he wanted to keep his UFC-contract. Hall immediately landed a knee on Leben and landed multiple punches throughout the fight.  Eventually, Hall dropped Leben with a punch in the first round, though Leben was saved by the round ending.  Leben asked his trainer "Did I get knocked out?"  He then stated "I'm done, man" and the fight was ended between the first and second round.

Hall fought through an injured toe against Thiago Santos at UFC 175 on July 5, 2014, to a win through unanimous decision.

Hall was expected to face Costas Philippou on January 18, 2015 at UFC Fight Night 59, a rematch of their previous fight in 2011. However, Philippou would be forced out of the bout due to injury. Hall was expected to face Strikeforce veteran Louis Taylor at the event, On January 11, it was announced that Taylor pulled out of the fight due to a pulled muscle in his back and had his contract terminated as a result.  In turn, Hall faced promotional newcomer Ron Stallings, whom he defeated via TKO in the first round. Hall knocked Stallings down with a punch and followed up with several more on the ground. When Stallings returned to his feet, referee Herb Dean stopped the fight to check a cut that had opened up on Stallings' face, and the ringside doctor declared the cut too severe for Stallings to continue.

Hall lost via split decision against Rafael Natal on May 23, 2015 at UFC 187. Hall was expected to face Krzysztof Jotko on June 20, 2015 at UFC Fight Night 69, replacing an injured Derek Brunson. However, three days after the booking, Hall was removed due to an alleged visa issue. In turn, Jotko was removed from the card entirely. Hall was expected to face Joe Riggs on August 8, 2015 at UFC Fight Night 73, but Riggs pulled out of the fight in late July citing injury. Riggs was replaced by promotional newcomer Oluwale Bamgbose, whom Hall defeated by TKO in the first round.

Hall faced Gegard Mousasi on September 27, 2015 at UFC Fight Night 75, filling in for Roan Carneiro. After being taken down and dominated on the ground throughout the first round, Hall stunned Mousasi with a spinning kick followed by a flying knee and earned the TKO stoppage with a flurry of punches on the ground in the opening seconds of the second round. A significant underdog prior to the fight, Hall was awarded a Performance of The Night bonus.

Hall made a quick return to the cage as he faced Robert Whittaker on November 15, 2015 at UFC 193, replacing an injured Michael Bisping. Hall lost the fight by unanimous decision.

Hall was expected to face Anderson Silva on May 14, 2016 at UFC 198. However, Silva pulled out of the bout on May 10 after requiring a surgery to remove his gallbladder. As a result, Hall did not compete at the event.

Hall next faced Derek Brunson on September 17, 2016 at UFC Fight Night 94. Hall lost the fight by TKO in the first round.

Hall next faced Gegard Mousasi in a rematch on November 19, 2016 at UFC Fight Night 99. He lost the fight via TKO in the first round after being taken down and hit with multiple right hands.

Hall faced Krzysztof Jotko on September 16, 2017 at UFC Fight Night 116. After being rocked and mounted in the first round, Hall rallied in the second round and won via TKO due to punches. The win also earned Hall his second Performance of the Night bonus award.

Hall was expected to face Vitor Belfort on January 14, 2018 at UFC Fight Night: Stephens vs. Choi. However, on January 13, 2018, it was announced that Hall did not make it to weigh-in as he fainted en route to the weight-ins and the bout was cancelled.

Hall was expected to face Paulo Costa on April 21, 2018 at UFC Fight Night 128. However, Costa pulled out of the fight in mid-March with an arm injury. In turn, promotion officials elected to pull Hall from that event entirely and reschedule the pairing for July 7, 2018 at UFC 226. Hall lost the fight via technical knockout in round two. 

Hall next faced newcomer Bevon Lewis on December 29, 2018 at UFC 232. He won the fight via knockout in the third round.  

Hall faced Antônio Carlos Júnior on September 14, 2019 at UFC on ESPN+ 16. Hall won the fight via split decision.

Hall was scheduled to face Ronaldo Souza on April 14, 2020 at UFC 249. However, on April 9, Dana White, the president of UFC announced that this event was postponed and the bout was scheduled on May 9, 2020. On May 8, Souza withdrew from the fight after testing positive for COVID-19.

Hall was scheduled to face Yoel Romero on August 22, 2020 at UFC on ESPN 15. However, Romero pulled out of the fight on August 11 for undisclosed reasons. In turn, Hall was removed from the card and will be rescheduled for a future event.

Hall faced Anderson Silva on October 31, 2020, at UFC Fight Night 181. He won the fight via technical knockout in round four.

A rematch with Chris Weidman was expected to take place on February 13, 2021 at UFC 258 However, Weidman was pulled from the event due to a positive COVID-19 test and the bout was cancelled, The rematch took place at UFC 261 on April 24, 2021. At the start of the first round, Weidman threw a heavy outside low kick which Hall checked with his left knee. This check snapped Weidman's left fibula and tibia on contact. Weidman immediately fell to the mat, forcing referee Herb Dean to stop the fight and declare Hall the winner via technical knockout. This win made Hall the first fighter in UFC history to win a fight without throwing a single strike.

Hall was expected to face Sean Strickland on August 7, 2021 at UFC 265. However on June 4, 2021, the bout was moved to headline UFC on ESPN: Hall vs. Strickland on July 31, 2021. Hall lost the fight via unanimous decision.

Hall was scheduled to face André Muniz on April 16, 2022, at UFC Fight Night 206. However, Hall withdrew due to undisclosed reasons. The bout with Muniz was rescheduled for UFC 276 on July 2. He lost the bout via unanimous decision.

On August 10, 2022, Hall announced his retirement from MMA competition.

Boxing career
Hall was announced to make his boxing debut on a four-round cruiserweight fight against former American football player Le'Veon Bell as an undercard of the Jake Paul vs. Anderson Silva event on October 29, 2022 at the Desert Diamond Arena in Arizona. Hall won the fight via Unanimous Decision (40-36 x3)

Championships and accomplishments
 Ultimate Fighting Championship
 The Ultimate Fighter 17 Knockout of the Season
 The Ultimate Fighter 17 Tournament Runner-Up
 Performance of the Night (Two times) 
 Tied for most knockout victories in UFC Middleweight division history (eight) with Anderson Silva & Thiago Santos.
 Ring of Combat
 ROC Middleweight Championship (Two times)
 MMAJunkie.com
 2015 September Knockout of the Month vs. Gegard Mousasi

Personal life 
Hall had a role in the 2015 movie "Street” starring Beau "Casper" Smart.

Mixed martial arts record

|-
|Loss
|align=center|17–11
|André Muniz
|Decision (unanimous)
|UFC 276
| 
|align=center|3
|align=center|5:00
|Las Vegas, Nevada, United States
|
|-
|Loss
|align=center|17–10
|Sean Strickland
|Decision (unanimous)
|UFC on ESPN: Hall vs. Strickland 
|
|align=center|5
|align=center|5:00
|Las Vegas, Nevada, United States
|
|-
|Win
|align=center|17–9
|Chris Weidman
|TKO (leg injury)
|UFC 261
|
|align=center|1
|align=center|0:17
|Jacksonville, Florida, United States
|
|-
|Win
|align=center|16–9
|Anderson Silva
|TKO (punches)
|UFC Fight Night: Hall vs. Silva
|
|align=center|4
|align=center|1:24
|Las Vegas, Nevada, United States
|
|-
|Win
|align=center|15–9
|Antônio Carlos Júnior
|Decision (split)
|UFC Fight Night: Cowboy vs. Gaethje
|
|align=center|3
|align=center|5:00
|Vancouver, British Columbia, Canada
|
|-
|Win
|align=center|14–9
|Bevon Lewis
|KO (punch)
|UFC 232
|
|align=center|3
|align=center|1:32
|Inglewood, California, United States
|
|-
|Loss
|align=center|13–9
|Paulo Costa
|TKO (punches)
|UFC 226
|
|align=center|2
|align=center|2:38
|Las Vegas, Nevada, United States
|
|-
|Win
|align=center|13–8
|Krzysztof Jotko
|TKO (punches)
|UFC Fight Night: Rockhold vs. Branch 
|
|align=center|2
|align=center|2:25
|Pittsburgh, Pennsylvania, United States
|
|-
|Loss
|align=center|12–8
|Gegard Mousasi
|TKO (punches)
|UFC Fight Night: Mousasi vs. Hall 2
|
|align=center|1
|align=center|4:37
|Belfast, Northern Ireland
|
|-
|Loss
|align=center|12–7
|Derek Brunson
|TKO (punches)
|UFC Fight Night: Poirier vs. Johnson
|
|align=center|1
|align=center|1:41
|Hidalgo, Texas, United States
|
|-
|Loss
|align=center|12–6
|Robert Whittaker
|Decision (unanimous)
|UFC 193
|
|align=center|3
|align=center|5:00
|Melbourne, Australia
|
|-
|Win
|align=center|12–5
|Gegard Mousasi
|TKO (flying knee and punches)
|UFC Fight Night: Barnett vs. Nelson
|
|align=center|2
|align=center|0:25
|Saitama, Japan
|
|-
|Win
|align=center|11–5
|Oluwale Bamgbose
|TKO (punches)
|UFC Fight Night: Teixeira vs. Saint Preux
|
|align=center|1
|align=center|2:32
|Nashville, Tennessee, United States
|
|-
|Loss
|align=center|10–5
|Rafael Natal
|Decision (split)
|UFC 187
|
|align=center|3
|align=center|5:00
|Las Vegas, Nevada, United States
|
|-
|Win
|align=center|10–4
|Ron Stallings
|TKO (doctor stoppage)
|UFC Fight Night: McGregor vs. Siver
|
|align=center|1
|align=center|3:37
|Boston, Massachusetts, United States
|
|-
|Win
|align=center|9–4
|Thiago Santos
|Decision (unanimous)
|UFC 175
|
|align=center|3
|align=center|5:00
|Las Vegas, Nevada, United States
|
|-
|Win
|align=center|8–4
|Chris Leben
|TKO (retirement)
|UFC 168
|
|align=center|1
|align=center|5:00
|Las Vegas, Nevada, United States
|
|-
|Loss
|align=center|7–4
|John Howard
|Decision (split)
|UFC Fight Night: Shogun vs. Sonnen
|
|align=center|3
|align=center|5:00
|Boston, Massachusetts, United States
|
|-
|Loss
|align=center|7–3
|Kelvin Gastelum
|Decision (split)
|The Ultimate Fighter: Team Jones vs. Team Sonnen Finale
|
|align=center|3
|align=center|5:00
|Las Vegas, Nevada, United States
|
|-
|Win
|align=center|7–2
|Nodar Kudukhashvili
|Decision (unanimous)
|Ring of Combat 41
|
|align=center|3
|align=center|5:00
|Atlantic City, New Jersey, United States
|
|-
|Win
|align=center|6–2
|Daniel Akinyemi
|Submission (heel hook)
|Ring of Combat 39
|
|align=center|1
|align=center|4:48
|Atlantic City, New Jersey, United States
|
|-
|Win
|align=center|5–2
|Aung La Nsang
|KO (punch)
|Ring of Combat 35
|
|align=center|3
|align=center|1:37
|Atlantic City, New Jersey, United States
|
|-
|Loss
|align=center|4–2
|Costas Philippou
|Decision (majority)
|Ring of Combat 34
|
|align=center|3
|align=center|4:00
|Atlantic City, New Jersey, United States
|
|-
|Loss
|align=center|4–1
|Chris Weidman
|TKO (punches)
|Ring of Combat 31
|
|align=center|1
|align=center|3:06
|Atlantic City, New Jersey, United States
|
|-
|Win
|align=center|4–0
|Roger Carroll
|TKO (submission to punch)
|Ring of Combat 30
|
|align=center|1
|align=center|2:41
|Atlantic City, New Jersey, United States
|
|-
|Win
|align=center|3–0
|Mitch Whitesel
|TKO (punches)
|Ring of Combat 27
|
|align=center|3
|align=center|2:34
|Atlantic City, New Jersey, United States
|
|-
|Win
|align=center|2–0
|Edwin Aguilar
|TKO (head kicks)
|Bellator 11
|
|align=center|3
|align=center|4:31
|Uncasville, Connecticut, United States
|
|-
|Win
|align=center|1–0
| Mike Iannone
| KO (punches)
| Ring of Combat 9
|
|align=center|1
|align=center|0:44
|Asbury Park, New Jersey, United States
|

|-
|Win
|align=center|4–0
|Dylan Andrews
|TKO (punches)
|rowspan=4|The Ultimate Fighter: Team Jones vs. Team Sonnen
| (airdate)
|align=center|2
|align=center|4:50
|rowspan=4|Las Vegas, Nevada, United States
|
|-
|Win
|align=center|3–0
|Bubba McDaniel
| KO (punch)
| (airdate)
|align=center|1
|align=center|0:08
|
|-
|Win
|align=center|2–0
|Adam Cella
|KO (spinning hook kick)
| (airdate)
|align=center|1
|align=center|4:55
|
|-
|Win
|align=center|1–0
|Andy Enz
|Decision (unanimous)
| (airdate)
|align=center|2
|align=center|5:00
|
|-

Boxing record

Professional

See also
 List of male mixed martial artists

References

External links

 Living people
Jamaican emigrants to the United States
Jamaican male karateka
Jamaican male kickboxers
Jamaican male mixed martial artists
Jamaican practitioners of Brazilian jiu-jitsu
American male karateka
American male kickboxers
American male mixed martial artists
American practitioners of Brazilian jiu-jitsu
Mixed martial artists utilizing Kyokushin kaikan
Mixed martial artists utilizing Brazilian jiu-jitsu
Middleweight mixed martial artists
Mixed martial artists from New York (state)
People from Saint Catherine Parish
People from Queens, New York
1984 births
Ultimate Fighting Championship male fighters